Esquerdinha (Portuguese for "lefty") may refer to:

Esquerdinha (footballer, born 1972), full name José Araújo, Brazilian footballer
Esquerdinha (footballer, born 1980), full name Glasner da Silva Albuquerque, Brazilian footballer
Esquerdinha (footballer, born January 1984), full name Eduardo Souza Reis, Brazilian footballer
Esquerdinha (footballer, born April 1984), full name Gilvan Gomes Vieira, Brazilian footballer
Esquerdinha (footballer, born 1989), full name Rubens Raimundo da Silva, Brazilian footballer
Esquerdinha (footballer, born 1990), full name Francisco Lisvaldo Daniel Duarte, Brazilian footballer
Esquerdinha (footballer, born 1992), full name Victor de Almeida Sandes, Brazilian football midfielder

See also
 Left-footer